Rollan A. Roberts is an American politician and pastor serving as a Republican member of the West Virginia Senate for the 9th district. He assumed office on January 9, 2019.

Early life and education 
Roberts was born in Redding, California. He earned a Bachelor of Arts degree in Bible and Biblical languages from Pensacola Christian College.

Career 
Since 1988, Roberts has been an administrator at Victory Baptist Academy in Raleigh County, West Virginia. He was elected to the West Virginia Senate in January 2019. During the 2019–2020 legislative session, Roberts served as vice chair of the Senate Enrolled Bills Committee. In the 2021–2022 session, he is vice chair of the Senate Education Committee and chair of the Senate Workforce Committee.

In January 2023, his son, Rollan Roberts II, announced his candidacy for the 2024 United States presidential election.

References

Living people
People from Raleigh County, West Virginia
People from Redding, California
Republican Party West Virginia state senators
Pensacola Christian College alumni
American school administrators
Baptists from West Virginia
21st-century American politicians
Year of birth missing (living people)
Baptist ministers from the United States